The Festival TransAmériques (FTA) is an annual dance and theater festival held in Montreal, Quebec, Canada.

References

External links
Festival TransAmeriques - website
Montreal About - events
canada.encyclopedia (fr)

Dance festivals in Canada
Festivals in Montreal

Arts festivals in Quebec
Theatre festivals in Canada